Dacapo Records is a Danish classical music and new music record label. It was founded in 1989 to promote the classical and new music of Denmark and represents itself as "the Danish National label" ("Danmarks nationale pladeselskab"). The board includes university and Danish Radio appointees. Dacapo also produces jazz and experimental music.

Major projects
Dacapo's publications have included several large recording projects, in particular the Danmarks Nationale Musikantologi, and Den danske sangskat (Treasury of Danish Songs).

Dacapo music store
Dacapo Records' web store offers the label's full catalogue in various formats, including as mp3 format and the superior 24-bit digital audio.

Artists
The label's artists include:

 David Abell
 Anne Marie Fjord Abildskov
 Hans Abrahamsen
 Matthias Aeschbacher
 David Alberman
 Jens Albinus
 Aldubarán
 Rinaldo Alessandrini
 Alpha
 Birgitte Alsted
 Frode Andersen
 Kai Normann Andersen
 Stig Fogh Andersen
 Karl-Gustav Andersson
 Mogens Andresen
 Ole Edvard Antonsen
 Arditti String Quartet
 Arild String Quartet
 Bodil Arnesen
 Ars Nova Copenhagen
 Art of Brass Copenhagen
 Max Artved
 Britt Marie Aruhn
 Lars Arvidson
 Signe Asmussen
 Athelas Sinfonietta Copenhagen
 Musica Ficta

References

Classical music in Denmark
Classical music record labels
Jazz record labels
Record labels established in 1989
Danish record labels
Record labels based in Copenhagen
1989 establishments in Denmark
Companies based in Frederiksberg Municipality